The Theodore B. Wilcox Country Estate, located in Portland, Oregon, is listed on the National Register of Historic Places.

See also
 National Register of Historic Places listings in Multnomah County, Oregon

References

Houses on the National Register of Historic Places in Portland, Oregon
National Register of Historic Places in Multnomah County, Oregon